Samuel J. Keith (1834–1916) was a state representative in South Carolina. He was a carpenter. He served in the Confederate Army. He was a Republican and served in the South Carolina House of Representatives during the Reconstruction era from 1870 to 1877. He represented Darlington County, South Carolina. In 1878 he became a Democrat.

References

External links 
 

1834 births
1916 deaths
Members of the South Carolina House of Representatives
Confederate States Army soldiers